Hogna pseudoceratiola is a species of wolf spider in the genus Hogna of the family Lycosidae. It was described for the first time by Wallace in 1942.

References 

Spiders of the United States
Lycosidae
Spiders described in 1942